Chinyalisaur Airport, also known as Maa Ganga Airport and Dharasu Airport or Bharkot Airport, is located in Chinyalisaur of Uttarkashi district in the Indian state of Uttarakhand. The airport is situated 35 kilometres away from Uttarkashi and 85 kilometers from New Tehri on the banks of the Bhagirathi River.

Civil aviation usage

The airport was initially constructed to cater to the needs of tourist and pilgrim traffic to the region, but lay unused as air charter companies did not start operations to the area.

Military usage as ALG
The Indian Air Force also uses the airport as an Advanced Landing Ground (ALG).

See also

 Military bases 
 List of ALGs
 List of Indian Air Force stations
 India-China military deployment on LAC

 Borders
 Line of Actual Control (LAC)
 Borders of China
 Borders of India

 Other related topics
 India-China Border Roads
 List of extreme points of India
 Defence Institute of High Altitude Research

References

External links
 IAF's ALG
 Air Marshal K. K. Nohwar, Pace of Infrastructure Development in Border Areas: Adequate?, Centre for Air Power Studies, 13 March 2018

Airports in Uttarakhand
Proposed airports in Uttarakhand
Uttarkashi district
Airports with year of establishment missing